Henry Gillespie (July 14, 1896 – June 1, 1963) was an American Negro league pitcher in the 1920s and 1930s.

A native of Cheraw, South Carolina, Gillespie made his Negro leagues debut in 1921 with the Hilldale Club. He went on to play for several teams, and finished his career in 1932 with the Bacharach Giants. Gillespie died in Philadelphia, Pennsylvania in 1963 at age 66.

References

External links
 and Baseball-Reference Black Baseball stats and Seamheads

1896 births
1963 deaths
Bacharach Giants players
Baltimore Black Sox players
Harrisburg Giants players
Hilldale Club players
Lincoln Giants players
Philadelphia Tigers players
20th-century African-American sportspeople
Baseball pitchers